Do You Wanna Get Away may refer to:

 "Do You Wanna Get Away" (song), a 1985 single by Shannon
 Do You Wanna Get Away (album), a 1985 album by Shannon